Small World Social is a technology company based in Sydney, Australia. Founded in 2008, the company now has offices in Melbourne, Australia and San Francisco, USA with staff based all over the world.

Company history 
Small World Social originally focused on using social media to change people's behaviors primarily in the area of health, health promotion and public policy.

In 2009, the company patented a method and system for explaining complex concepts online. It now holds a portfolio of technology patents and has continued to have a research and development center based in Melbourne, Australia.

In 2010 the company conducted research to develop a social networking training curriculum for Sydney teachers.

Between 2010 - 2015 Small World Social worked with a variety of clients, including creating a professional training app with Genentech and working with New Balance to educate podiatrists, retail sales staff and fitness trainers about the scientific benefits of lightweight, low profile footwear.

In 2016 Small World Social partnered with Lexus to convert their user manual into Lexus Now, an app for drivers with how-to guides.

Current work 
Today the company continues to work in the field of complex digital knowledge transfer and behavioral change, working with clients in the fields of health, science, medical device and manufacturing.

Small World Social’s staff includes CEO Kathy Phelan, Project Lead and Director of HelpMe Feed Maddy Sands, and Head of Maternal Child Health Karina Ayers.

Small World Social is currently working on HelpMe Feed, an app for health professionals supporting mothers to breastfeed.

Technology 
Small World Social's technology is used in applications where tacit knowledge transfer is required. The SaaS technology platform works across a range of mobile and wearable technology, providing content relevant to each of these different form factors.

Awards

2014
In February 2014, Small World Social was awarded an internal Genentech Technology Innovation Award.

In early March 2014, in Hamburg, Germany, the company was awarded a Silver Medal at the 2014 World Media Festival for its work on the Genentech Learning Portal App.

Also in March 2014, the company was awarded a Gold Astrid Award in New York for its Learning Portal App.

In May 2014, Small World Social and the ABA won the Gold Questar Award in the Emerging Media: App section, for the Breastfeeding with Google Glass App.

In June 2014, Small World Social's Breastfeeding Support Project was awarded the Questar Best of Category Grand Prize For Emerging Media, which is given to the top 5% of entries.

In July 2014, Small World Social's Breastfeeding Support Project was awarded a Bronze Medal at the 2014 IDA International Design Awards for excellence in Multimedia Interface design.

In October 2014, Small World Social's Breastfeeding Support Project received honorable mention at the 2014 Victorian Public Healthcare Awards for optimizing healthcare through e-health & communications technology excellence.

2015
On June 3, 2015 Small World Social was named a finalist for LTEN's 2015 Excellence Awards.

Later in the same year Small World Social received honourable mention in Website Design Competition at Annual International Design Awards for Lexus Now: Reinventing the Car Owner's Manual.

2016
In April 2016 Small World Social was awarded the Hermes Creative Award (Gold) - Mobile Information Experience for the LEXUS NOW: THE FUTURE OF THE AUTOMOTIVE EXPERIENCE app. That was followed by being awarded the winner for Mobile Sites - Guides/Ratings/Reviews in the 22ND Annual Communicator Awards.

In November 2016, Small World won a Gold MarCom Award in the Mobile Website Information category for Lexus Now, earning two awards within the W3 creative awards, one Silver Award (third tier award) in the General Website-Automotive category and one Gold (second tier award, one of hundreds given out) in the Mobile Apps/Sites-Innovative/Experimental category, and receiving an American Graphic Design Award from GDUSA.

Impact 
Small World Social’s Australian programs have affected the behavior change of an estimated 4 million people in Australia The company now works across the world with a focus on adopting the latest technology so that enterprises can achieve their business objectives. The company employs many wearable and mobile computing devices to achieve this end.

Diversity 
The company consists of over 50 employees of 25 different nationalities and a diverse range of disciplines and backgrounds represented. This includes content researchers, designers, videographers, computer scientists, engineers and business analysts. The company's innovation approach follows a design thinking methodology. It approaches innovation challenges by structuring teams into small cross-disciplinary groups of 6 to 8 people that work together on projects, akin to the skunk works teams used by Lockheed Martin during the 1950s. This diversity in thinking and approach has been a key to its rapid growth and success as a startup company.

References 

Companies based in Sydney
Technology companies established in 2008
Social media companies
Australian companies established in 2008